Worldline SA is a French multinational payment and transactional services company founded in 1974.

It is the European leader in the payments and transactional services industry and #4 player worldwide with over 20,000 employees in more than 50 countries.

Services offered by Worldline in the areas of Merchant Services; Terminals, Solutions & Services; Financial Services and Mobility & e-Transactional Services include domestic and cross-border commercial acquiring, both in-store and online, highly-secure payment transaction processing, a broad portfolio of payment terminals as well as e-ticketing and digital services in the industrial environment.

In 2021 Worldline generated a proforma revenue of 3.7 billion euros.

History

1970–2004: beginnings and diversification 

Worldline's first activities in processing payment card transactions date back to the 1970s, first under the name of Sligos - resulting from the merger in 1973 between Sliga, a subsidiary of the Crédit Lyonnais bank, and Cegos - then, from the 1980s, with Segin, specializing in particular in transactions on Minitel. From the 1990s, the company diversified into online payments with Axime, which gave birth - after its merger with Sligos - to the Atos Group.

2004–2014: integration into Atos 

In 2004, Atos integrated its payment and online services activities into a division then called Atos Worldline.

In 2006, Atos Worldline included in its scope the Belgian companies Banksys, responsible for securing and guaranteeing electronic payments in Belgium, and Bank Card Company (BCC), specializing in the management of payment systems linked to the country's two largest credit card networks, Visa and MasterCard. The two companies, employing around 1,100 people with a turnover of 309 million euros, were bought out from their four shareholders: Dexia, Fortis, ING, and KBC.

In 2010, Atos Worldline acquired and integrated the Indian company Venture Infotek for around 100 million dollars. The company, specializing in payment and transaction processing, had merchants, as well as banks and government programs, as clients locally.

In 2011, Atos acquired the IT services activities of Siemens, which also included electronic transaction activities, which were integrated into its Worldline division. In 2012, Atos Worldline acquired and integrated Quality Equipment, a Dutch electronic payment company, for an unknown amount.

In 2013, Atos branched out its Atos Worldline division, giving it more autonomy.

In 2014, Atos partially listed Worldline for 26.59% of its holdings worth 575 million euros, valuing Worldline at a capitalization of 2.1 billion euros.

Since 2014: consolidator of European payments 

In November 2015, Worldline merged its electronic financial transaction processing activities with Equens, a Dutch company. As part of this merger, Worldline paid out 72 million euros and owned 63.6% of the created equensWorldline Company, the rest being held by the shareholders of Equens, Dutch, German and Italian banks. In the context of this merger, Worldline acquired the possibility in the long term to acquire the remaining shares of these banks.

In July 2017, Worldline announced the acquisition of the Swedish company Digital River World Payments (DRWP) for an undisclosed amount. The company, founded in 1997 and based in Stockholm, generated annual sales of 37 million dollars.

Next, Worldline acquired First Data Baltics, a subsidiary of First Data Corp in Lithuania, Latvia, and Estonia for approximately 73 million euros. These three subsidiaries generated a turnover of 23 million euros in 2016, employing around 200 people.

In May 2018, Worldline acquired SIX Payment Services (Europe) SA, the payment services division of the Swiss group SIX, for €2.3 billion, mainly financed by the issue of new actions. With the integration of SIX Payment Services’ 1,600 employees and merchant acquisition activities and services serving more than 200,000 merchants for an income of around 530 million euros, Worldline gained a 30% increase in turnover as well as a number one place in Switzerland, Austria, and Luxembourg. Worldline's ambition through this operation was to create a European payment champion.

In January 2019, Atos, which then had a 50.8% stake, announced the sale by an exchange of shares of a 23.4% stake in Worldline to its shareholders.

Since 2019: Worldline becomes an independent company 

In May 2019, Worldline gained independence when Atos’ shareholders approved the plan to redistribute 23.4% of Worldline shares to their investors. Atos still remained Worldline's main shareholder at 27% just ahead of the SIX Group but lost the possibility to control its finances.

In September 2019, Worldline announced the completion of the acquisition of the 36.4% minority interest in equensWorldline, hence becoming the sole owner of equensWorldline.

In February 2020, Worldline announced the acquisition of Ingenico, the world leader in the payment terminal market, for 7.8 billion euros subject to the green light from the competition regulators. The shareholders of Worldline would retain a 65% stake and those of Ingenico 35%. Following this announcement, Atos announced the sale of a 13.1% stake, keeping only a 3.8% stake in Worldline. In parallel, Bpifrance announced the increase of its stake in the company.

In March 2020, Worldline entered the CAC 40, the flagship index of the Paris stock market, which mainly reflected the evolution of the Group's liquidity and market capitalization from 2.2 billion euros in June 2014 at the time of its listing on the stock exchange to more than 11 billion euros when it entered the CAC 40.

In April 2020, Worldline announced the acquisition of GoPay through the purchase of 53% of its shares. The company also announced the contemplated purchase of all remaining shares for 2022. GoPay is a specialist in online payments in Eastern Europe. Through this acquisition, Worldline intended to reinforce its offers to merchants and to strengthen its position in Eastern and Central Europe.

In May 2020, its CEO Gilles Grapinet announced the creation of EDPIA (the European Digital Payment Industry Alliance), a professional organization bringing together the main European companies specializing in electronic payments (Ingenico, Nets, Nexi, and Worldline), and which has set itself the objective of better coordinating the representation of major industrialists in the sector with European authorities and other stakeholders in the payments ecosystem. Gilles Grapinet is its first president.

In October 2020, Worldline welcomed Ingenico, creating together a global payment service provider.

In October 2021, Worldline announced its Q3 2021 revenue and, as planned at the time of the Ingenico's acquisition, the new governance of the Group was implemented by the Board of Directors, with Bernard Bourigeaud appointed as Chairman while Gilles Grapinet remains CEO.

In March 2022, Worldline, announced its business expansion to Japan, offering credit card payment processing for merchants nationwide.

In September 2022 - Worldline India, a leader in digital payment services announced the launch of Paytech Pioneer Program to on-board some of India’s best Engineering Talent from college campuses across the country.This program aims to provide a platform for fintech start-ups to showcase their innovative payment solutions and receive mentorship from industry experts.

In January 2023, Worldline, announced the launch of its Buland Bharat digital payments suite, which is designed specially keeping in mind the needs and wants of small and medium businesses (SMBs) in India.

Activities 

Worldline's revenue was divided, in 2020, as follows:

 Merchant services (47%)
 Terminals, Solutions & Services (28%)
 Financial services (19%)
 Mobility & transactional web services (7%)

Fintech

New payment methods 

In spring 2017, Worldline developed in collaboration with the Belgian bank Belfius the first smartphone payment application in Belgium.

Worldline also operates Saferpay.

Management 
 Chairman of the Board (Independent director): Bernard Bourigeaud
 CEO (since July 2013): Gilles Grapinet
 Deputy CEO (since July 2013): Marc-Henri Desportes

Shareholders 

List of main shareholders as of January 31, 2021.

References

Financial technology companies
Payment systems
Online payments
French companies established in 1974
Payment service providers
Financial services companies established in 1974
Companies based in Île-de-France
Companies listed on Euronext Paris
CAC 40